Passaic River Bridge may refer to:

Lincoln Highway Passaic River Bridge
Route 46 Passaic River Bridge
or any of a number of bridges included in:
List of crossings of the Lower Passaic River
List of crossings of the Upper Passaic River